The Federal Hill Historic District is a national historic district located in Lynchburg, Virginia. The district's architecture consists primarily of free-standing brick or frame houses in a variety of styles but of harmonious scale. Included are three important French Second Empire houses standing near one another on Harrison Street. There is also a notable assemblage of free-standing dwellings in architectural styles ranging in date from the early 19th century through the Edwardian styles of the early 20th century. There is an important collection of early Federal-style townhouses.

It was listed on the National Register of Historic Places in 1980.

Gallery

References

Historic districts in Lynchburg, Virginia
Greek Revival architecture in Virginia
Second Empire architecture in Virginia
Queen Anne architecture in Virginia
Federal architecture in Virginia
Buildings and structures in Lynchburg, Virginia
National Register of Historic Places in Lynchburg, Virginia
Historic districts on the National Register of Historic Places in Virginia